In enzymology, a ribose isomerase is an enzyme that catalyzes the chemical reaction

D-ribose  D-ribulose

Hence, this enzyme has one substrate, D-ribose, and one product, D-ribulose.

This enzyme belongs to the family of isomerases, specifically those intramolecular oxidoreductases interconverting aldoses and ketoses.  The systematic name of this enzyme class is D-ribose aldose-ketose-isomerase. Other names in common use include D-ribose isomerase, and D-ribose ketol-isomerase.

References

 

EC 5.3.1
Enzymes of unknown structure